The BMW R1200RS is a sport-touring motorcycle produced by BMW Motorrad. The Sports Tourer is largely based on the liquid-cooled roadster R1200R (series K53, FIN 0A04 Tool). The bike was presented in September 2014 at the Intermot. The road-oriented allrounder is equipped with a boxer engine and assembled at the BMW plant in Berlin. Production began on 9 February 2015 and was launched on 12 May 2015 at a base price of EUR 13,500. The internal factory code is K54.

For the 2019 Model Year, the R1200RS was succeeded by the R1250RS.

References

External links

 

R1200RS
Motorcycles powered by flat engines
Shaft drive motorcycles
Sport touring motorcycles
Motorcycles introduced in 2015